Orin Savage Cottage is a historic cure cottage located at Saranac Lake, Franklin County, New York.  It was built about 1910 and is a two-story, square frame dwelling on a rubble foundation.  It is topped by a hipped roof with shed roof dormers.  It features a large open verandah with Doric order columns in the Colonial Revival style, two cure porches, and a sleeping porch.

It was listed on the National Register of Historic Places in 1992.

References

Houses on the National Register of Historic Places in New York (state)
Colonial Revival architecture in New York (state)
Houses completed in 1910
Houses in Franklin County, New York
National Register of Historic Places in Franklin County, New York